Eksmo is one of the largest publishing houses in Russia. Eksmo and AST (which it later acquired in 2012) together publish approximately 30% of all Russian books.

Established in 1991 as a small book-selling company, Eksmo gradually developed into a major player in the Russian market, discovering and developing detective-novel authors such as Darya Dontsova and Alexandra Marinina, as well as publishing works by Tatyana Tolstaya, Lyudmila Ulitskaya, Tatiana Vedenska, and Viktor Pelevin. Eksmo has become especially successful as a publisher of Russian science fiction and fantasy, with writers like Sergey Lukyanenko, Yuri Nikitin, Vasily Golovachev, Nick Perumov, Vera Kamsha, Vadim Panov and Tony Vilgotsky.

Other book series published by Eksmo include the Mona Lisa series of Russian-language translations of authors such as Mary Stewart.

Controversy

In 2011 Eksmo received criticism for publishing books which glorify Stalin and his henchmen, such as "Renaissance of Stalin", "Beria, the best manager of the 20th century" (Берия — лучший менеджер XX века, 2008) by S. Kremlev, and "Handbook of a Stalinist" (Настольная книга сталиниста, 2010) by Yuri Zhukov. A group of writers and artists, including Alexander Gelman signed an open letter questioning its editorial policy. Oleg Novikov, the director of the publishing house, responded that he felt obligated to cater to the taste of his readers, and not to censor them.

See also
 Comix-ART

References

Book publishing companies of Russia
Publishing companies established in 1991
Comic book publishing companies of Russia
Russian speculative fiction publishers
1991 establishments in Russia
Companies based in Moscow